The Complete Blam Blam Bam is a compilation LP by Blam Blam Blam.  It was released on November, 1992.

Track listing

There Is No Depression In New Zealand - 03:17
Battleship Grey - 03:01
Maids To Order - 03:27
Dr. Who - 02:25
Motivation - 04:12
Blue Belmonts - 05:10
Respect - 03:35
Got To Be Guilty - 03:30
Don't Fight It Marsha, It's Bigger Than Both Of Us - 04:45
Learning To Like Ourselves Again - 03:27
Call For Help - 
Time Enough - 03:08
Like My Job - 03:17
Luxury Length - 03:14
Businessmen - 03:08
Talkback King - 03:49
The Bystanders - 05:39
Beach On 42nd Street - 04:38
Last Post - 02:55

Personnel
 Tim Mahon - Vocals, Bass
 Mark Bell - Guitar, vocals
 Don McGlashan - Drums, Vocals, Bass

References

1992 compilation albums
Blam Blam Blam albums